Te'Ron Stephon Johnson (born December 12, 1993) is an American professional basketball player for the Niagara River Lions of the NBL Canada. He played college basketball for Purdue, Houston and Auburn.

High school career
Johnson attended North Central High School in Indianapolis. Johnson was twice named to the Associated Press All-State and was named the Marion County Player of the Year as a senior in 2012. He was also an IndyStar Indiana All-Star in 2012. He committed to Purdue to play alongside older brother Terone Johnson.

College career
Ronnie Johnson averaged 10.3 points, 4.1 assists and 3.4 rebounds per game as a freshman at Purdue. In his sophomore season, Johnson averaged 10.8 points and 3.7 assists per game. However, he said he felt coach Matt Painter lost confidence in him. After visiting Xavier and receiving interest from Tennessee, Johnson transferred to Houston after the season and sat out a year. He started 13 games as a redshirt junior at Houston and averaged 9.4 points and 2.9 assists per game. After the season, he transferred again to Auburn. As a senior at Auburn, Johnson averaged 7.8 points and 2.3 assists per game on an 18-14 team.

Professional career
Johnson joined the Niagara River Lions of NBL Canada in January 2018. In his first game against the KW Titans, he scored seven points. He had a season-high 24 points in a 126–123 win over the Cape Breton Highlanders on March 14. Johnson averaged 7.4 points, 2.6 rebounds and 2.2 assists per game in his rookie season.

References

External links
 Purdue Boilermakers bio
 Auburn Tigers bio

1993 births
Living people
American men's basketball players
American expatriate basketball people in Canada
Basketball players from Indianapolis
Purdue Boilermakers men's basketball players
Houston Cougars men's basketball players
Auburn Tigers men's basketball players
Niagara River Lions players
Point guards